Divulapitiya is a town in Gampaha District, Western Province, Sri Lanka.

Education
There are a number of Schools in Divulapitiya.
 Divulapitiya Sri Gnanodaya Central College.
 Hunumulla Central College.
 Divulapitiya Ghanawasa College.
 Aluthepola Walagamba Maha Vidyalaya.

Tourist attractions
 Balagalla Saraswathi Pirivena, is an ancient Vihara and Buddhist educational centre located in Divulapitiya. The pirivena was established on 7 March 1903 and currently it has been protected as one of archaeological protected monument in Sri Lanka.
 Balagalla Walawwa, is an archaeologically protected Walawwa in Divulapitiya and it is also the home of late Minister Lakshman Jayakody.

Climate 
The climate in Divulapitiya is classified as Af by the Köppen climate classification. The annual rain fall is about 2540 mm and the average temperature is about 27.0 °C. April is the warmest month with temperature averages 28.0 °C.

References

External links 
 Divulapitiya Divisional Secretariat

Populated places in Gampaha District